The South African cricket team toured England in 2012 to play three Test matches, five One Day Internationals and three Twenty20 International matches. The number of Test matches between the two nations had to be reduced to avoid clashes with the Olympic Games.

Preparations 
The South Africa squad spent four days with explorer Mike Horn in Switzerland before the tour began. Horn and South Africa head coach Gary Kirsten had worked together during India's successful 2011 Cricket World Cup campaign. Horn's training focused on putting the team through physical exertion to improve their mental strength. Several members of the squad, including Mark Boucher and Dale Steyn, recalled the training period as being the toughest few days of their lives. He worked with the team again as a "special assistant" for further training before the third Test.

Squads 

1 Thami Tsolekile was brought into the South African squad after Mark Boucher's retirement from international cricket due to an eye injury sustained in the tour match against Somerset.

2 James Tredwell was brought into the England squad to replace Graeme Swann after the second ODI.

Tour matches

Two-day: Somerset v South Africans

First-class: Kent v South Africans

Two-day: Worcestershire v South Africans

Two-day: Derbyshire v South Africans

List A: Gloucestershire Gladiators v South Africans

Test series

1st Test

2nd Test

3rd Test

ODI series

1st ODI

2nd ODI

3rd ODI

4th ODI

5th ODI

T20I series

1st T20I

2nd T20I

3rd T20I

Statistics

Test series
England
Alastair Cook scored his 20th century when he scored 115 in the first innings of the 1st Test.
Graeme Swann reached 1,000 career runs when he scored seven in the second innings of the 1st Test.
Kevin Pietersen reached 7,000 career runs when he scored 149 in the first innings of the 2nd Test.
Kevin Pietersen scored his 21st century when he scored 149 in the first innings of the 2nd Test.
Andrew Strauss reached 7,000 career runs when he scored 22 in the second innings of the 2nd Test.
Stuart Broad took his sixth five-wicket haul in the second innings of the 2nd Test.
Matt Prior reached 3,000 career runs when he scored 73 in the second innings of the 3rd Test.

References

2012
International cricket competitions in 2012
2012 in English cricket